The Van Marter Building, located at 423–427 East Beale Street in Kingman, Arizona, was built in 1921 and has been listed in the National Register of Historic Placed since May 14, 1986.  The building was built with a Mission/Spanish Revival architectural style.   J. B. Lammers of Flagstaff, Arizona was the contractor.

The building was the business location for Van Marter Enterprizes, housing his mortician and shoemaker shops.  The building had office space, shoe shop, headstones sales, and lease office space.

References

Commercial buildings completed in 1921
Buildings and structures in Kingman, Arizona
Commercial buildings on the National Register of Historic Places in Arizona
Commercial buildings in Arizona
National Register of Historic Places in Kingman, Arizona
1921 establishments in Arizona